Gordonia scortechinii is a species of plant in the family Theaceae. It is a tree endemic to Peninsular Malaysia. It is threatened by habitat loss.

References

scortechinii
Endemic flora of Peninsular Malaysia
Trees of Peninsular Malaysia
Vulnerable plants
Taxonomy articles created by Polbot
Taxobox binomials not recognized by IUCN